Laurence Hirsch Silberman (October 12, 1935 – October 2, 2022) was an American jurist, diplomat, and government official who served as a United States circuit judge of the United States Court of Appeals for the District of Columbia Circuit from 1985 until his death. He was appointed in October 1985 by President Ronald Reagan and took senior status on November 1, 2000. On June 11, 2008, President George W. Bush awarded Silberman the Presidential Medal of Freedom.

Early life and education
Silberman was born in 1935 to a Jewish family in York, Pennsylvania. He graduated from Dartmouth College with a Bachelor of Arts in history in 1957. After serving six months of active duty in the US Army (five-and-a-half years in reserve), he attended Harvard Law School and graduated in 1961 with a Bachelor of Laws degree.

Career
Silberman worked in the private sector as a partner at the law firms Moore, Silberman & Schulze in Honolulu and Morrison & Foerster and Steptoe & Johnson in Washington, D.C. He also served as Executive Vice President of Crocker National Bank in San Francisco. His government service included stints as an attorney in the National Labor Relations Board's appellate section, as Solicitor of Labor from 1969 to 1970, and as Undersecretary of Labor from 1970 to 1973. As Solicitor, he was largely responsible for developing the requirement of goals and timetables as an enforcement device for the affirmative action order. He subsequently regretted his stance and wrote, "Our use of numerical standards in pursuit of equal opportunity has led to the very quotas guaranteeing equal results that we initially wished to avoid."

He also led the development of legislation to implement "final offer selection" as a means of resolving labor disputes. As Undersecretary, he repeatedly clashed with Charles "Chuck" Colson and tendered his resignation to compel the hiring of a black regional director in New York in 1972.

President Richard Nixon nominated Silberman to be Deputy Attorney General of the United States in January 1974. Silberman was tasked with reviewing J. Edgar Hoover's secret files, which he described as "the single worst experience of my long governmental service." Silberman stated that "this country – and the Federal Bureau of Investigation – would be well served if [Hoover's] name were removed from the bureau's building. It is as if the Defense Department were named for Aaron Burr. Liberals and conservatives should unite to support legislation to accomplish this repudiation of a very sad chapter in American history." Silberman also served briefly as Acting Attorney General during the Watergate crisis. Silberman's resignation was accepted by President Gerald Ford, pending the confirmation of his successor.

Ford nominated Silberman as ambassador to Yugoslavia in April 1975. He served in the role until he resigned during the presidential transition of Jimmy Carter. At the same time, Silberman also served as the Presidential Special Envoy for International Labor Organization Affairs. As ambassador, he succeeded in freeing an American, Laszlo Toth, who had been falsely imprisoned by the regime as a CIA agent, by putting pressure on both the Yugoslav regime and the State Department. During the campaign for the 1980 presidential election, he was co-chairman of Ronald Reagan's foreign policy advisors. From 1981 to 1985, he served as a member of the General Advisory Committee on Arms Control and Disarmament and the Defense Policy Board.

In total, Silberman has held six Senate-confirmed positions and never received a dissenting vote.

Federal judicial service
Silberman was nominated by President Ronald Reagan on September 11, 1985, to the United States Court of Appeals for the District of Columbia Circuit, to a new seat created by 98 Stat. 333. He was confirmed by the United States Senate on October 25, 1985, and received commission on October 28, 1985. He assumed senior status on November 1, 2000.

Silberman was on the short list of potential nominees to the U.S. Supreme Court on three separate occasions in 1987, 1990, and 1991. However, after the rejection of Robert Bork with whom Silberman had served on the District of Columbia Circuit, he was regarded as controversial. Unlike fellow conservatives Pasco Bowman II and John Clifford Wallace, Silberman even drew some opposition from Republican senators because although he was a judicial conservative and thus was likely against Roe v. Wade as a legal matter, he was thought to be personally pro-choice. Meanwhile, some criticized him for having an explosive temper while he was Deputy Attorney General, and at the same time, others noted that "he expect[ed] people to pound the table and shout right back" and uniquely possessed "the interest, talent and capacity for administration." It was also reported Silberman faced criticism over legal issues arising from his time at Crocker National Bank at which he had been executive vice-president between 1979 and 1983, but that appears to have been pretextual given the FBI had cleared him of any wrongdoing and he had since been confirmed to the D.C. Circuit unanimously.

He was a member of the United States Foreign Intelligence Surveillance Court of Review at the time of its first ever session in 2002.

On February 6, 2004, Silberman was appointed co-chairman of the Iraq Intelligence Commission, an independent blue-ribbon panel created to investigate U.S. intelligence surrounding the United States' 2003 invasion of Iraq and Iraq's weapons of mass destruction. In the wake of the resignation of Alberto Gonzales as United States Attorney General in 2007, Silberman was mentioned as a possible successor.

In 2008, Judge Silberman, joined by five other senior judges, initiated a suit against the United States, "claiming that when Congress refused to authorize statutory cost-of-living raises for federal judges, it violated the Compensation Clause [of the Constitution]". The Federal Judges Association opposed bringing the suit. The suit was ultimately successful, leading to a nationwide rise in pay for all federal judges as of January 1, 2014.

In 2015, Silberman wrote an op-ed in the Wall Street Journal, writing that the charge that "President Bush deceived the American people about the threat from Saddam" reminded him of "a similarly baseless accusation that helped the Nazis come to power in Germany."

In October 2021, Silberman won the first annual Justice Clarence Thomas First Principles Award for his judicial service. The Wall Street Journal editorial board called him "one of the all-time giants of the federal bench" and perhaps "the most influential judge never to have sat on the Supreme Court."

Legal opinions
As a judge, Silberman authored a number of noteworthy opinions:
 In In re Sealed Case, 838 F.2d 476 (1988), Silberman held that the procedures for appointing independent counsels violated the Appointments Clause of the U.S. Constitution and the separation of powers, because they interfered with the President's ability to ensure that the laws are "faithfully executed". This decision was subsequently reversed by the Supreme Court in Morrison v. Olson, 487 U.S. 654 (1988), over a vigorous dissent by Justice Antonin Scalia.
 In a later per curiam decision captioned In re: Sealed Case No. 02-001, 310 F.3d 717 (2002), the court upheld a provision of the Patriot Act that made it easier for law enforcement officers and intelligence officers to share information with each other. This was an important decision involving interpretation of the Patriot Act, the use of foreign intelligence, and the role of the FISA Court. Silberman subsequently disclosed that he had in fact written the opinion.
 In Parker v. District of Columbia, 478 F.3d 370 (2007), Silberman held that the District of Columbia's flat ban on the registration and carrying of firearms violated the Second Amendment right "to keep and bear arms". The case was subsequently upheld by the Supreme Court in District of Columbia v. Heller, 554 U.S. 570 (2008).
 In Seven-Sky v. Holder, 661 F.3d 1 (2011), Silberman authored an opinion upholding the Affordable Care Act as a constitutional exercise of the Commerce Power, on the grounds that individuals' decisions to remain uninsured, in the aggregate, have a substantial effect on interstate commerce. At the time, a number of commentators viewed Judge Silberman's opinion as an important bellwether of how the Supreme Court might decide the case. The Supreme Court ultimately rejected Judge Silberman's reasoning in National Federation of Independent Business v. Sebelius, 132 S. Ct. 2566 (2012), by a vote of 5 to 4, upholding the Affordable Care Act instead as an exercise of the taxing power. Some commentators praised Silberman, a Reagan appointee, for his "judicial restraint" in upholding the signature statute of a Democratic administration. Writing in Slate, Simon Lazarus described Silberman as a "conservative icon" and noted that "despite intense short-term political pressures and long-term ideological stakes, leading conservative jurists appear likely to stick to their traditional judicial restraint canon when deciding the fate of the Affordable Care Act".
 Dissenting vigorously in Tah v. Global Witness Publishing, Inc. Silberman called on the Supreme Court to overturn New York Times v. Sullivan, and claimed that The New York Times and The Washington Post are "virtually Democratic Party broadsheets," and labeled "[n]early all television—network and cable—a Democratic Party trumpet." His dissent also accused big tech companies of censoring conservatives and warned that "Democratic Party ideological control" of the media may be a prelude to an "authoritarian or dictatorial regime" that constitutes "a threat to a viable democracy".

Criticism

"October Surprise" 
Some commentators have speculated that Silberman may have been involved in the so-called "October Surprise" with respect to the Iran hostage crisis prior to the 1980 presidential election, alleging that Silberman and others had attended meetings to negotiate the delayed release of the hostages by the Iranian government.

Silberman publicly responded as follows to the allegations:

On January 3, 1993, the bipartisan Joint Report of the Task Force to Investigate Certain Allegations Concerning the Holding of American Hostages by Iran in 1980, also known as the "October Surprise Task Force," was released. The Task Force, led by Rep. Lee H. Hamilton (D) and Rep. Henry J. Hyde (R), specifically concluded that "there is wholly insufficient evidence of any communications by or on behalf of the 1980 Reagan Presidential campaign with any persons representing or connected with the Iranian government or with those holding Americans as hostages during the 1979-1981 period" and that "there is no credible evidence supporting any attempt or proposal to attempt, by the Reagan Presidential Campaign – or persons representing or associated with the campaign – to delay the release of the American hostages in Iran."

Iran–Contra affair 
Silberman served on a panel of the D.C. Circuit in U.S. vs. Oliver L. North, 910 F.2d 843 (1990), in which a per curiam opinion was issued that overturned the conviction of Oliver North, who had been a key figure in perpetrating the Iran–Contra affair.

In his memoir, Firewall, published seven years after the case in 1997, Lawrence Walsh, the Independent Counsel appointed by President Reagan to investigate the Iran Contra Affair, he mused that in retrospect, he wished that he had moved for Silberman's recusal from the panel:

Silberman also observed that David Brock, latterly a Silberman critic (see below), published a refutation of Lawrence Walsh's characterization of Judge Silberman's involvement in the North case:

Yale Law School protest
On March 17, 2022, several news outlets published an email that Silberman had sent to all Article III federal judges regarding a protest at Yale Law School. In the email, Silberman suggested that students who disrupted a Federalist Society event by shouting down a speaker should be barred from consideration for potential clerkships because they clearly do not respect free speech principles. The panel discussion, which focused on remedies for First Amendment violations, featured Monica Miller, the legal director of the American Humanist Association, and Kristen Waggoner, general counsel for Alliance Defending Freedom. Several outlets criticized Silberman's characterization of the event, while others praised it.

Academic career
Silberman was a lecturer at the University of Hawaiʻi from 1962 to 1963. He was an Adjunct Professor of Administrative Law at Georgetown University Law Center from 1987 to 1994 and from 1997 to 1999, at NYU from 1995 to 1996, and at Harvard in 1998. He held the position of Distinguished Visitor from the Judiciary at Georgetown University Law Center from 2000 to 2019 and taught both administrative law and labor law. Silberman received the Charles Fahy Distinguished Adjunct Professor Award for the 2002–2003 academic year. He has also received a Lifetime Service Award (2006) and a Distinguished Service Award (2007) from the Federalist Society chapters of Georgetown and Harvard, respectively.

Personal life and death
Silberman's first wife, Rosalie "Ricky" Gaull Silberman, co-founder of the Independent Women's Forum, died on February 17, 2007. Together, they had three children, Robert S. Silberman, Kate Fischer, and Anne Otis. His eight grandchildren include the screenwriter and film producer Katie Silberman. Silberman married Patricia Winn Silberman in 2008.   

Silberman was a close friend of Justice Antonin Scalia since he had recruited Scalia into the Ford administration. Silberman was also a friend of Justice Clarence Thomas and in 1989 encouraged a young and reluctant Thomas to accept a federal judgeship on the United States Court of Appeals for the District of Columbia Circuit. Several of his former law clerks have become federal judges, including US Supreme Court justice Amy Coney Barrett.

Silberman died on October 2, 2022, ten days before his 87th birthday.

See also

 List of Jewish American jurists
 List of Presidential Medal of Freedom recipients

References

External links
 
 

1935 births
2022 deaths
20th-century American diplomats
20th-century American judges
20th-century American Jews
Ambassadors of the United States to Yugoslavia
American bankers
Dartmouth College alumni
Georgetown University Law Center faculty
Harvard Law School alumni
Judges of the United States Court of Appeals for the D.C. Circuit
Lawyers from Washington, D.C.
Military personnel from Pennsylvania
People associated with Morrison & Foerster
People from York, Pennsylvania
Presidential Medal of Freedom recipients
United States court of appeals judges appointed by Ronald Reagan
United States Deputy Attorneys General
University of Hawaiʻi faculty
Washington, D.C., Republicans